Ron Bayliss is a Northern Irish former professional footballer who played as a defender.

Career
After playing with their youth team, Bayliss spent four seasons with the senior team of Reading, making 38 appearances in the Football League. After leaving Reading, Bayliss spent two seasons with Bradford City, before dropping into non-league football with Yeovil Town.

References

1940s births
Living people
Association footballers from Northern Ireland
Reading F.C. players
Bradford City A.F.C. players
Yeovil Town F.C. players
English Football League players
Association football defenders